Blusas are individuals in the autonomous Basque region in Spain who dress in the traditional clothes of the region and attend events in Vitoria-Gasteiz (Basque Country) such as the Virgen Blanca Festivities. The blusas assemble in groups called cuadrillas, and their main role is to provide entertainment at these events.

Etymology 
Etymologically, blusas comes from the Basque language and refers to the typical long shirts worn at the festivities. However, this word was a loanword from the Spanish blusa which describes the clothes worn in the countryside by farmers. It was also a loanword from the French blouse, which itself had a German origin.

History 

The festivities in Vitoria-Gasteiz have a rural origin. It was originally held for attendance at los toros. Throughout history they have been developed in accordance with the population. 
Even though the beginning of the blusas tradition is pretty unknown, it is believed that it may have a direct relationship with the myth of Celedón.  There are several versions of this story as the tale was passed down orally. However, two versions are noted by Basque traditions as the most reliable ones:
 The first version tells the story of Celedonio Aizola, an outgoing bricklayer from Zalduondo. His fame came from his good people skills used in the Virgen Blanca Festivities several decades before. It is said that every time he stepped into this village, he made all the inhabitants gather in order to party with him. Later, in 1975, some friends of his came up with an idea to hang an artificial figure which resembled Celedonio so as to make the Vitoria's festivities start some year after the man's death. In modern events that invention is part of the tradition.
 The second version is about Celedón Iturralde. A friend of his, Pedro Fernandez de Retana, who was the organist of Vitoria around the 1870s, took the role of organizing this village's festivities. This man emphasized in telling that he was doing it as a memorial of Celedon Iturralde, who died 12 years before in the Carlist Wars. In 1918, Mariano San Miguel gathered all the traditional songs of the festivities into a song book, and among them there was the song which Celedón wrote with the phrase: "Celedón ha hecho una casa nueva. Celedón, con ventana y balcón". These lines talk about the house which was made by Celedón in Bitoriano (a small village next to Vitoria) where he had a balcony and a window (mentioned in the song several times).

This emblematic character of the Basque is seen as the origin of the festivities of Vitoria-Gasteiz. It is a mystery when the blusas and neskas officially began the tradition of dressing up, but it is believed by Basque citizens that at the very beginning, there used to be only men. However, those ancient characteristics have gradually changed up to the point that nowadays almost every cuadrilla is mixed.  It is thought that blusas have celebrated this tradition from its very beginning to modern celebrations inconsistently, but after the civil war and the time of dictation this tradition disappeared for some years.

The "cuadrillas" in the present day 
The "cuadrillas" are usually thought to be just a grouping of inhabitants in the festivities, but they are far more than that. In fact, they give social aid by going to elderly's residences or organizing special events for children during the year. Their brotherhood goes much further into other festivities such as "San Prudencio". The cuadrillas have the notion that to them there are no real rules. Nevertheless, they do have some unwritten ones, which are given from the old to the new. Besides, everybody has the opportunity to join these groups in exchange for some money.

Festival routine 
Blusas are the main cheerleaders of festivals and thus their routine is connected to it. During the corrida, they gather and parade near the bullring without entering. Their activities could be divided into two parts:
 Religious activities: Consists of going to San Miguel's church and participating in the religious pilgrimage in order to give the Virgen Blanca bouquets of flowers.
 Social activities: As an example, doing the famous "Paseillos" or organizing activities from the citizens. The Paseillo is to parade across the center of the city with a fixed route. During the parade, each cuadrilla goes dancing, singing, and drinking happily with the help of musicians who play "txarangas" (songs with a lively rhythm and catchy lyrics). Meanwhile, the audience stays on the edges of the road the blusas have to follow. Young ladies especially wait for the blusas to pick them and take them to dance. The blusas give stickers which symbolise the cuadrilla they belong to, which are meant to be placed on to festival-goers clothing.

Attire 
The blusas wear the typical rural attire the Araba natives once wore. The outfit consists of a shirt, a "blusa" (blouse), a pair of trousers and the "albarcas" whereas "neskas" wear a blouse, long skirt and "albarcas".

Cuadrillas 
 Alegrios
 Basatiak
 Batasuna
 Belakiak
 Bereziak
 Biznietos de Celedón
 Los Desiguales
 Galtzagorri
 Gasteiztarrak
 Hegotarrak
 Jatorrak
 Karraxi
 Luken
 Martinikos
 Okerrak
 Nekazariak
 Petralak
 Turutarrak
 Txinpartak
 Txirrita
 Txolintxo
 Zintzarri
 Zoroak

See also 
  Virgen Blanca Festivities

References 

 http://www.blogseitb.com/vitoriagasteiz/2012/03/06/vitoria-descubre-quien-fue-celedon-y-donde-esta-su-casa/
 http://www.euskonews.com/0632zbk/elkar_eu.html
 http://www.elcorreo.com/alava/fiestas/vitoria-gasteiz-la-blanca/noticias/blusas-vitoria-descubierto-201207251056.html

External links 
 (Basque) http://www.euskonews.com/0632zbk/elkar_eu.html

Basque culture
Vitoria-Gasteiz
Basque festivals